For the cycling competitions at the 2020 Summer Olympics , the following qualification systems are in place.

Qualification summary

Legend
TS – Team sprint
KE – Keirin
SP – Sprint
TP – Team pursuit
OM – Omnium
MD – Madison
RR – Road race
TT – Individual time trial
RC – Race
FR – Freestyle
Q – Quotas
R – Riders

Track cycling
Track cycling is done entirely through UCI nation rankings. The quotas per event are as follows:
 Team sprint – top 8 teams per gender
 Team pursuit – top 8 teams per gender
 Madison – all NOCs with a qualified team pursuit, in addition to the next 8 teams per gender (total of 16 teams)
 Omnium – NOCs directly qualifying for Madison, in addition to the next 12 (men) or 13 (women) (21 individuals)
 Sprint – NOCs qualifying in team sprint enter 2 individuals, in addition to the next 7 best-ranked in individual sprint, and the next 7 best-ranked in Keirin (total of 30 individuals)
 Keirin – NOCs qualifying in team sprint enter 2 individuals, in addition to the next 7 best-ranked in individual sprint, and the next 7 best-ranked in Keirin (total of 30 individuals)

Road cycling
Majority of the places in road cycling are attributed through the UCI nation rankings (122 for men, 62 for women), with special provisions for highly-ranked individuals whose nations do not make it. A small number of additional places are available through individual road race continental championships (2 men and 1 woman each for Africa, Americas, and Asia). Host nation Japan has obtained 2 guaranteed spots per gender in the road race. For the road time trial, the NOC must have qualified for the road race. The top 30 (men) or 15 (women) NOCs in the nation rankings may enter a time trial cyclist. The 2019 World Championships also afford 10 places per gender in the time trial. NOCs can have a maximum of 2 time trial entries if they qualify through each of those two methods.

Mountain biking
For mountain biking, 38 spots per gender are allocated. Thirty places will be allocated through the UCI nation rankings and three through continental championships with one each for Africa, Americas, and Asia. One spot per gender has been reserved for host nation Japan. The remaining four spots will be awarded to the top mountain bikers competing at the 2019 UCI World Championships, with two each in the elite and under-23, respectively.

BMX
In the BMX race, twenty-four spots are available for each gender, with one reserved for host nation Japan. Eighteen places will be awarded to the highest-ranked NOCs through the UCI qualification rankings, three through the UCI individual rankings, and the remaining two through the 2020 UCI World Championships. In the BMX freestyle events, nine spots are available for each gender, with one reserved for host nation Japan, six for the highest-ranked NOCs through the UCI rankings, and the remaining two for those competing at the 2019 UCI Urban Cycling World Championships.

Timeline 
The following is a timeline of the qualification events for the cycling events at the 2020 Summer Olympics.

Road cycling

Men's road race

* Quota reduced by one to accommodate for the individual qualifiers

Men's individual time trial

** Qualified as a continental representative

Women's road race 

* Quota reduced by one to accommodate for the individual qualifiers

Women's individual time trial

** Qualified as a continental representative

Track cycling

Track cycling quotas were released by the UCI in March 2020.

Men's team sprint

Men's sprint

* Qualified as a continental representative

Men's Keirin

Men's team pursuit

Men's Madison

Men's Omnium

* Qualified as a continental representative

Women's team sprint

Women's sprint

* Qualified as a continental representative

Women's Keirin

Women's team pursuit

Women's Madison

Cycling Canada declined to enter a team in the women's madison due to a lack of competitive experience in the event, and the event being prior to the omnium in the Olympic program.

Women's Omnium

* Qualified as a continental representative

Mountain biking

Quotas were released in May 2021.

Men's cross-country race

Women's cross-country race

BMX

Racing quotas were released on June 4, 2021.

Men's BMX race

** Qualified as a continental representative

Women's BMX race

** Qualified as a continental representative

Men's BMX freestyle

Women's BMX freestyle

References

Qualification for the 2020 Summer Olympics
Cycling qualification for the Summer Olympics
Qualification